Winnipeg North is a federal electoral district in Canada that has been represented in the House of Commons of Canada since 1917. It covers the northern portion of Winnipeg, Manitoba.

Geography
The riding includes the neighbourhoods of Jefferson North, Mandalay West, Maple Glen, Garden City, Jefferson, St. John's, Inkster Faraday, William Whyte, Dufferin, North End, Burrows Central, Robertson, Selkirk, Mynarski, Northwood, Shaughnessy Heights, Lord, Tyndall Park, Garden Grove, Oak Point, Inkster Gardens, Luxton, the south part of The Maples and the north part of Logan CPR in the Winnipeg.

Demographics

According to the Canada 2021 Census; 2013 representation

Languages: 49.4% English, 18.1% Tagalog, 12.9% Punjabi, 1.2% Portuguese
Religions: 56.2% Christian (37.8% Catholic, 1.6% Anglican, 1.5% United Church, 1.3% Pentecostal, 1% Baptist), 24.3% No religion, 14.2% Sikh, 2% Hindu, 1.2% Buddhist 
Median income (2020): $34,800 
Average income (2010): $38,760

Winnipeg North is the riding with: 

 The highest % of people of Filipino ethnic origin (31.1%)
 The highest % of people belonging to the Filipino visible minority group (33.1%)
 The highest % of native speakers of Tagalog (Pilipino, Filipino) (18.1%)
 The highest % of immigrants from Philippines in the overall population (24.9%)

History
This riding was originally created in 1914 from Winnipeg and Selkirk ridings.

In 1997, it was renamed "Winnipeg North—St. Paul".

In 2003, Winnipeg North—St. Paul was abolished with parts transferred to Winnipeg North, Winnipeg Centre and Kildonan—St. Paul ridings.  Winnipeg North was re-created from parts of Winnipeg North—St. Paul and Winnipeg North Centre.

Historically a safe seat for the New Democratic Party, in 2011 Winnipeg North was narrowly retained by Liberal incumbent Kevin Lamoureux in an otherwise dismal performance by the party nationwide. Along with Wascana around Regina, Saskatchewan, Winnipeg North was one of only two seats won by the Liberals in the Prairie Provinces.

This riding gained territory from Kildonan—St. Paul during the 2012 Canadian federal electoral redistribution.

Kevin Lamoureux was re-elected to represent Winnipeg North in the 2015 Canadian federal election, as the Liberals formed a majority government. In 2015, he was the only incumbent MP from Winnipeg to be re-elected. He was re-elected in 2019 and 2021.

Members of Parliament
This riding has elected the following Members of Parliament:

Election results

Winnipeg North, 2004–present

Winnipeg North, 1917–1993Note: NDP vote is compared to CCF vote in 1958 election. Communist vote is compared to Labour-Progressive vote in 1958 election.Note: Labour-Progressive vote is compared to Communist vote in 1940 election. Progressive Conservative vote is compared to "National Government" vote in 1940 election.Note: Conservative vote is compared to Government vote in 1917 election. Liberal vote is compared to Opposition vote in 1711 election.''

See also
 List of Canadian federal electoral districts
 Past Canadian electoral districts

References

Sources

 
 
 Expenditures - 2008
Expenditures - 2004

Manitoba federal electoral districts
North End, Winnipeg
Politics of Winnipeg